Brahmani temple is a Hindu and Buddhist temple located in Avana, Baleswar, Odisha, India built in the 10th–11th centuries A.D. It is a living temple and the presiding deity is an eight-armed three-faced Chamunda image. It is a protected monument of Odisha State Archaeology.

Location
It is on the left bank of the river Son and is about 6 km north of Ajodhya. It is 21 km from the Baleshwar town, Orissa.

Construction
It is a pidha temple followed by a flat roofed open mandapa. The presiding deity of the temple is an eight-armed Chamunda image and iconographically it can be dated to the 10th–11th centuries A.D. The temple is a modern one but it houses a few important specimen of Buddhist and Saviate sculptures, datable to the same centuries.

Quantification
Area dimension (L x B x H): 4.20 m x 4.00 m x 6.50 m
Number of blocks: Two, vimana followed by a mandapa

Spatial organization
Orientation: Facing towards west
Plan: The vimana is square; mandapa is rectangular
Allocation of spaces: 10 m x 4.50 m in length and width respectively

Architectural style

Ornamentation
Exteriors: Plain
Interiors: Plain
Movable collections: Four-armed Avaloketesvara, eight-armed and three-faced Chamunda.
It is a recently built shrine with pancharatha on plan and panchanga bada in elevation.

Construction technology 
Structural System: It has a pidha vimana fronted by a flat Jaga mohan. The vimana is pancharatha on plan and panchaga bada in elevation.
Building techniques: Ashlar masonry
Material of construction: Laterite used for the temple; the images are made of chlorite stone.
Vermilion and oil is regularly applied over the images by the priest, which may be harmful for the stone carvings in long run.

Footnotes

References
Sahoo. Ashis Ranjan, Pradhan. Dr. S. Report on Bramhani Temple. Indira Gandhi National Centre for the Arts
R. P. Mohapatra, 1986, Archaeology in Orissa, Vol. II, New Delhi

External links
Images of Brahmani temple

Hindu temples in Balasore district